Nur Fasha Sandha Hassan (born 28 March 1984) is a Malaysian actress who has appeared in films, television shows, and commercials.

Life and career
She was born in Johor Bahru but moved to Penang later. She then transferred to Kuala Lumpur, and later to Perlis due to her father's work. She was married to Rizal Ashram. They have two children together.

Since graduating from the Kuala Lumpur-based Institut Kebudayaan Negara in 2002, she has appeared in movies Black Maria, Bujang Senang, Gong and Cicak Man. Sandha was named most popular new actress in the 2005 Anugerah Bintang Popular for her performance on television drama Natasya. She won again 2011 Anugerah Bintang Popular for her outstanding acting in Chinta(TV Series) beating the other nominees, Tiz Zaqyah and Lisa Surihani.  She is also famous for her best-selling novel, Sumpahan Fasha (Fasha's Curse).

In 2007, she was appointed as the Maybelline ambassador, succeeding Siti Nurhaliza.

Personal life
In 2012, she married businessman Rizal Ashram Ramli. They had a son and a daughter and were divorced in 2016. 

She is currently married to actor Aidil Aziz since 2019 and has 1 daughter with him.

Filmography

Film

Television series

Telemovie

Television

Stage acting

Awards and nominations

References

External links
 Fasha Sandha = Filmography
All Fasha Sandha's News

1984 births
Living people
Malaysian people of Malay descent
Malaysian film actresses
Malaysian television personalities
Malaysian Muslims
Fasha Sandha
Malaysian television actresses
21st-century Malaysian actresses